Aethes deaurana is a moth of the family Tortricidae. It was described by Henri de Peyerimhoff in 1877. It is found in Portugal, Spain, the Pyrenees, southern France, Dalmatia, Sardinia, Algeria, Libya and Syria. The moth is a rare migrant to the south of England and may be resident in south Devon and Dorset.

The larvae feed inside the stems of umbelliferous plants such as alexanders (Smyrnium olusatrum) and Chelonus inanitus.

References

 Trichophaga bipartitella in lepidoptera catalog

deaurana
Moths described in 1877
Moths of Africa
Moths of Europe
Moths of the Middle East
Taxa named by Henri de Peyerimhoff